The six phases of a big project is a cynical take on the outcome of large projects, with an unspoken assumption about their seemingly inherent tendency towards chaos. It can be seen as a parody of the traditional process groups in a project lifecycle. The list is reprinted in slightly different variations in any number of project management books as a cautionary tale.

One such example gives the phases as:

Unbounded enthusiasm,
Total disillusionment,
Panic, hysteria and overtime,
Frantic search for the guilty,
Punishment of the innocent, and
Reward for the uninvolved.

References

Project management